Michael Anthony Hoffman II (born January 2, 1957) is an American author. He has been described by critics as a conspiracy theorist and by the Anti-Defamation League (among other sources), as a Holocaust denier and antisemite.

Biography
Hoffman was born to a Catholic family in Geneva, New York. His father, the chief of physical therapy at Clifton Springs Hospital, was German-American. His mother was Italian-American. According to biographical information on the back cover of his book Judaism Discovered, Hoffman studied at the State University of New York at Oswego under Dr. Richard Funk and Dr. Faiz Abu-Jaber, father of Diana Abu-Jaber.

Hoffman was reportedly taught at an early age about William Morgan, whose disappearance in 1826 resulted in the formation of the Anti-Masonic Party. He said that he learned from his maternal grandfather that elections in the United States were rigged by organized crime. From this, Hoffman was said to have deduced that "[n]othing is as it seems to be," which in turn led to a "life long vocation, researching the subterranean workings of the occult cryptocracy's orchestration of American history". 

Hoffman claims to have operated an organic farm and to have lived among the Amish for several years. In 1995, Hoffman moved with his family to northern Idaho. There, he hoped to establish a museum that would detail the "Communist holocaust against Christians" (i.e., the persecution of Christians in the Soviet Union), "the holocaust against the Germans", (i.e., the bombing of Dresden and other major German cities in World War II), and the "Holocaust against Japan" (i.e., the bombing of Tokyo and the atomic bombings of Hiroshima and Nagasaki).

Hoffman has written articles for the UK-based magazine Fortean Times, as well as the Lutheran newspaper Christian News of New Haven, MO, which is published by Otten. He has claimed to have worked as a reporter for the Albany, New York, bureau of the Associated Press. His interests include the alleged occult roots of Freemasonry, the command ideology of the Cryptocracy, Fortean phenomena, and the sacred texts of Orthodox Judaism.

Views

Holocaust denial and the Jews
Hoffman has been described by the Anti-Defamation League as a "Holocaust denier and anti-Semitic ideologue". Other authorities to call him a Holocaust denier include Michael Barkun of Syracuse University and Michael Whine. Mattias Gardell has asserted: "Antisemitism is prominent... in the worldview of Michael Hoffman II". 

Hoffman has worked on the projects of neo-Nazi Tom Metzger and of the Holocaust deniers Willis Carto, David Irving, Ernst Zündel, and Herman Otten. Hoffman was the Assistant Director of the Institute for Historical Review (!HR), a Holocaust denial organization for a period. He retains a connection with it. Stephen A. Atkins, in his book, Holocaust Denial as an International Movement (2009), wrote that Hoffman's newsletter Revisionist History promotes Holocaust denial and Hoffman contends that "the real Holocaust of World War II was deaths caused by the Allies." He quotes Hoffman denying the existence of gas chambers:
 

The Great Holocaust Trial: The Landmark Battle for the Right to Doubt the West's Most Sacred Relic (1985) is a sympathetic account of the 1980s Canadian trials of Ernst Zündel. At the time, Zündel was required to appear before the Canadian Human Rights Tribunal for "spreading false news", by distributing the Holocaust-denying pamphlet Did Six Million Really Die? in Canada. Hoffman's book argues that Holocaust denial material should be completely legal to publish.

On his YouTube channel in 2016, Hoffman said: "Judaism’s focus is on self-worship, people who worship themselves, and this is where I see a corollary with Nazis and with what Hitler was doing." He has claimed that Judaism has a positive view of pedophilia and advocates the hatred of non-Jews. He has claimed that early Jewish texts are equivalent to teachings "from the church of Satan".

Irish slavery myth
Hoffman is the author of They Were White and They Were Slaves: The Untold Story of Enslavement of Whites in Early America. The book was self-published in 1993.

According to Derrick Jensen, Hoffman is "overtly racist" and "attempts to make the case that the enslavement of whites by commercial interests in Britain and the Americas was worse than the enslavement and genocide of Africans... perpetrated by those same interests." Jensen said "Hoffman's analysis is seriously flawed" but that "his scholarship is impressive, and the story he tells is both interesting and horrifying".

The book's espousal of the Irish slaves myth is considered by Liam Hogan (interviewed by the Southern Poverty Law Center in 2016) to be responsible for the notion being absorbed by white supremacists.

Cryptocracy
Hoffman is the author of Secret Societies and Psychological Warfare which outlines his conspiracy theory of a shadow government or "cryptocracy" that gains power through manipulation of symbols and twilight language. Examples of such "psychodramas," in Hoffman's view, include Route 66 (which connects various centers of occult significance), and the Assassination of President John F. Kennedy, in which Hoffman sees ritualistic elements. The theory of masonic symbolism in the assassination of President Kennedy was first articulated by James Shelby Downard, with whom Hoffman co-authored King/Kill-33 which became the inspiration for a song by Marilyn Manson.

Hoffman also states that this ruling cabal is slowly revealing the truth through movies such as They Live and The Matrix and other forms of symbolic and subliminal communication. Hoffman has appeared on the Alex Jones radio show to discuss his theories. In a 2002 lecture in Sandpoint, Idaho, Hoffman analyzed the 9/11 terror attack in terms of human alchemy and psychological warfare.

Publications
Hoffman is the author of these self-published books:
The Great Holocaust Trial: The Landmark Battle for the Right to Doubt the West's Most Sacred Relic
Adolf Hitler: Enemy of the German People
They Were White and They Were Slaves: The Untold History of the Enslavement of Whites in Early America
The Israeli Holocaust Against the Palestinians (with Moshe Lieberman)
Secret Societies and Psychological Warfare
Judaism's Strange Gods
Judaism Discovered: A Study of the Anti-Biblical Religion of Racism, Self-Worship, Superstition and Deceit
Usury in Christendom: The Mortal Sin that Was and Now is Not
A Candidate for the Order (a novel)
The Occult Renaissance Church of Rome

Hoffman has also written the introductions for modern reprints, which he also published, of:
 The Traditions of the Jews by Johann Andreas Eisenmenger
 The Talmud Tested by Alexander McCaul, D.D.

References

External links 
 Revisionist History, personal website of Michael A. Hoffman II.

1957 births
Living people
Alt-right writers
American people of German descent
American people of Italian descent
Anti-Masonry
American Holocaust deniers
State University of New York at Oswego alumni
Critics of Judaism
Jewish–Christian debate